Le Péril Jaune (Yellow Peril) is the second studio album by French new wave post-punk band, Indochine. It was released in 1983 in France, Germany, Sweden, Netherlands and Spain.

Track listing
 Le Péril Jaune (Ouverture) - 0:48
 La Sécheresse Du Mékong - 3:28
 Razzia - 3:38
 Pavillon Rouge - 3:08
 Okinawa - 4:53
 Tankin - 2:11
 Miss Paramount - 3:00
 Shangaï - 2:40
 Kao Bang - 5:29
 A L'Est De Java - 5:03
 Le Péril Jaune (Fermeture) - 1:31

References

External links
 Detailed album information at www.indo-chine.org

1983 albums
Indochine (band) albums